Literature in the Esperanto language began before the first official publication in Esperanto in 1887: the language's creator, L. L. Zamenhof, translated poetry and prose into the language as he was developing it as a test of its completeness and expressiveness, and published several translations and a short original poem as an appendix to the first book on the language, Unua Libro. Other early speakers wrote poetry, stories, and essays in the language; Henri Vallienne was the first to write novels in Esperanto. The first female Esperanto novelist was Edith Alleyne Sinnotte with her book Lilio published in 1918. Except for a handful of poems, most of the literature from Esperanto's first two decades is now regarded as of historical interest only.

Between the two World Wars, several new poets and novelists published their first works, including several recognized as the first to produce work of outstanding quality in the still-young language: Julio Baghy, Eŭgeno Miĥalski, Kálmán Kalocsay, Heinrich Luyken, and Jean Forge.

Modern authors include Claude Piron and William Auld, who was nominated for the Nobel Prize in Literature.

Esperanto has seen a solid production of material in braille since the work of the blind Russian Esperantist Vasili Eroshenko, who wrote and taught in Japan and China in the 1910s and 1920s, and Harold Brown wrote several modern plays in Esperanto.

The largest Esperanto book service at the Universal Esperanto Association offers around 4,000 books in its catalog. About 130 novels have been published originally in Esperanto. Two major literary magazines: Literatura Foiro, and Beletra Almanako, are published regularly; some other magazines, such as Monato, also publish fiction.

The most comprehensive guide to the literature of the language is Geoffrey Sutton's Concise Encyclopedia of the Original Literature of Esperanto, published under the auspices of the Esperanto-speaking Writers' Association by Mondial.

Notable writers 

Some of the major figures of Esperanto literature: 
Edith Alleyne Sinnotte
Marjorie Boulton
William Auld
Julio Baghy
Kazimierz Bein (translations)
Jorge Camacho
Vasili Eroshenko
Antoni Grabowski (mainly translations)
Sten Johansson
Kálmán Kalocsay
Nikolai Vladimirovich Nekrasov
Mauro Nervi
Claude Piron
Frederic Pujulà i Vallès
Baldur Ragnarsson
Raymond Schwartz
Trevor Steele
Vladimir Varankin

See also
Bible translations into Esperanto
Esperanto culture
Department of Planned Languages and Esperanto Museum

References

 The Esperanto Book, Chapter 9: "The Literary Scene" by Don Harlow.  1995.
 La Fenomeno Esperanto by William Auld.  UEA, 1988.
 Concise Encyclopedia of the Original Literature of Esperanto by Geoffrey Sutton

External links
 Esperanto books at Faded Page (Canada)
 Writings in Esperanto at Project Gutenberg
 Beletra Almanako
 Notes about Esperanto literature
 UEA's book service

 
Esperanto